Ivan Vasilyov was a Bulgarian architect, born in 1893, deceased in 1979.

Together with Dimitar Tsolov, they established one of the most successful Bulgarian architectural studios called Vasilyov-Tsolov. Many of the landmarks of Sofia are their works, most notably SS. Cyril and Methodius National Library (1940-1953), St Nedelya Church, Sofia (1929), Sofia University Library (1932), Bulgarian National Bank headquarters (1939) and The Ministry of Defence headquarters (1939-1945).

In 2010, in their honor, a commemorative plaque was affixed to the National Library.

Biography and Career 

Born as Ivan Tsokov Vasilyov on 28 February 1893 in the town of Oryahovo, Bulgaria. In 1911, after completing high school in Sofia, he went to Munich to study painting. In 1914, Vasilyov started his education in architecture in the Karlsruhe Institute of Technology where he graduated in 1919. After returning to Bulgaria, he worked in collaboration with Stancho Belkovski on the design of Vlado Georgiev house, nowadays the Austrian Embassy. In 1925, Ivan Vasilyov started a long time cooperation with Dimitar Tsolov with whom he created one of the finest examples in the Bulgarian architecture of that era.

Works

Vasilyov-Tsolov 
1926 - Banya Palace, Banya village, Karlovo Municipality
1927 - The theatre of the army, Sofia
1928 - Crafts Bank (nowadays DSK bank), Sofia
1929 - St Nedelya Church, Sofia
1932 - Sofia University Library
1935 - Sofia municipality hall
1935-37 - Cultural center in Vratsa
1939 - Bulgarian National Bank headquarters
1939-45 - The Ministry of Defence headquarters, Sofia
1940-53 - SS. Cyril and Methodius National Library, Sofia
 Apartment buildings on “Vasil Levski” boulevard and “Tsar Osvoboditel” boulevard.

Other 
1923 - Vlado Georgiev house, nowadays the Austrian Embassy, Gladston str. 16, Sofia, (collaboration with Stancho Belkovski)
 Andrey Nikolov house, nowadays a Cultural center called “The Red House”, Lyuben Karavelov str. 15, Sofia
 D.A.Tsenov Academy of Economics, Svishtov

See also 
List of Bulgarian architects

References

External links
 Sofia University architects
 Vasilyov and Tsolov at Teteven Municipality web site

Bulgarian architects
1893 births
1979 deaths
People from Oryahovo